The 2021–22 Hrvatski telekom Premijer liga was the 31st season of the HT Premijer liga, the top-tier professional basketball league in Croatia.

Format 
The league will consist of 12 teams. The first half of the season will be played by a two-round system, while the teams in the second half of the season will be divided into two groups; Championship Round ( will consist of the top six teams from the first half of the season, while Relegation and Promotion Round will consist of the remaining six teams from the first half of the season.

The top four teams of Championship Round will secure a spot in the playoffs semifinals.

Current teams

Promotion and relegation 
Team promoted from the First League
 Cedevita Junior

Team relegated to the First League
 Hermes Analitica

Venues and locations

Personnel and sponsorships

Regular season

Standings

References

External links 

 Official website
 Scoresway page
 Eurobasket.com league page

A-1 Liga seasons
Croatian
2021–22 in Croatian basketball